The Battle Android Trooper (B.A.T.) is a fictional robot from the G.I. Joe: A Real American Hero toyline, comic books and animated series. Created by the evil Cobra Organization, the B.A.Ts provide disposable brute strength to the Cobra army.

Profile
BATs are the perfect Cobra trooper. They never question orders, shirk duty or surrender. They are cheap and easy to replace. However, BATs do not react well to changes in field conditions, or discriminate well between targets. They will shoot at anything that moves. Cobra Infantrymen don't like to be on the same battlefield with B.A.Ts, and will sometimes dispense BATs into a losing battle, by kicking them out of low-flying aircraft without parachutes. B.A.Ts also have a tendency to burst into flame when hit from behind.

The first production series of B.A.Ts was developed by Doctor Mindbender. These models had a humanoid form, with exposed electronics in their chest cavity for easy battlefield maintenance. The right forearm could be equipped with a flamethrower, laser cannon, gripper claw, or standard robotic hand. Doctor Mindbender has overseen subsequent modifications and customization of the B.A.Ts, including a streamlined appearance, increased targeting accuracy, and modular missile launcher systems. Though they have become more mindless with each successive design, their manufacturing process and weapons systems are continually being upgraded.

Toy history
As of March 2014, there have been more than 24 figures in the 3 3/4-inch line of the G.I. Joe: A Real American Hero toyline, most released as either B.A.T. or Cobra B.A.T., one figure released as B.A.A.T. (Battle Armored Android Trooper) as part of the Star Brigade line, one figure released as Cobra Inferno B.A.T, and one figure released as Cobra Sky B.A.T.

Vintage/Modern
The B.A.T. first appeared in the 1986 series of the toyline. A second version was released in 1991. A battle armored version, the B.A.A.T (Battle Armored Android Trooper) was released in 1993, as part of the Armor-Tech subset of the Star Brigade line. The B.A.T. was released again in 2002, as part of the full relaunch of the G.I. Joe toyline, using an all-new mold.

International Variants
In 1990, the first mold of B.A.T. was released as Robóid in Brazil.

Sigma 6
B.A.T. had two 8-inch figures, and was packaged in many of the 2.5-inch mission scale. The 8-inch figures included the Ninja-B.A.T., and the Sky B.A.T.

25th Anniversary
In 2008, Cobra B.A.T. was released as part of the 25th anniversary, with a new sculpt based on the original design. This version of the figure has thus far seen eight distinct releases. The 2008 carded figure, 2009 "Hall of Heroes figure", and "Defense of Cobra Island" box set figure (also released in 2009) were nearly identical, all based on the original toy decoration (with a silver visor), though the accessories vary (the "Hall of Heroes" and "Defense of Cobra Island" figures come with battle damage options and a canister for creeper vine spores, with the latter including a set of purple vines). The DVD Battles "Arise, Serpentor, Arise!" pack featured a red-visored B.A.T. based on its cartoon appearance, and a missile launcher in addition to its usual accessories. The G.I. Joe: Resolute box set figure featured a black and metallic red paint deco. The "Pursuit of Cobra" line featured a Jungle B.A.T., featuring green camouflage fatigues and additional jungle combat-themed accessories.

The two most recent releases of the 2008 B.A.T. mold have been exclusive releases. In 2012, a B.A.T. in Constructicon colors as part of a crossover set featuring the Transformers, available exclusively at the San Diego Comic-Con International. In 2013, the figure was released as the Nano-B.A.T. (featuring translucent green accessories and the battle-damaged parts of the "Hall of Heroes" release) as part of the G.I. Joe Collector's Club subscription figure offerings. In 2014, as part of the Toys "R" Us G.I. Joe 50th Anniversary line, the B.A.T. appeared in an arctic-based two-pack, facing off against G.I. Joe Team member Snow Job. This Arctic B.A.T. is mostly white with pixelated-looking gray camouflage on his uniform.

In 2015, the Transformers Collectors' Club reissued the Transformers: Prime Deluxe-class Soundwave toy in version 1 B.A.T. colors (with cartoon-style red visors), calling them Advanced Stealth B.A.T.s, and packaged in pairs along with a third figure, Old Snake - the version of Cobra Commander who appeared in the Transformers third-season episode "Only Human". The Advanced Stealth B.A.T.s transform into unmanned aerial vehicles.

Comics

Marvel Comics
B.A.Ts first appeared in issue #44 of the G.I. Joe comics published by Marvel Comics. They were robotic creations of Doctor Mindbender, who used them to gain entry into Cobra. Use of the B.A.Ts was sporadic. Their limited artificial intelligence prevented them from performing more complicated strategies and maneuvers. Still, that did not stop Cobra from using them altogether. They can still push farther than regular troops and take more damage. Nothing short of rendering them absolutely inoperative (i.e., destroy all vital core components) would stop them.

They were later used in attacking the Joe Team's headquarters the Pit, which ended up being beneficial to the G.I. Joe team. The Pit was currently empty of all but General Hawk and three high-ranking military officers. During the battle, two of the inspecting generals sacrifice themselves—and eventually the Pit—to save the others. The third general uses his influence to reinstate the team, as he and Hawk look over the remains of the headquarters.

A B.A.T is influential in G.I.Joe Yearbook #4. It is used to impersonate Cobra Commander in a coup attempt; it is disguised with his battle armor. The disguised BAT is captured by the Oktober Guard and in attempting to kill them destroys itself in helicopter blades.

Serpentor utilizes the B.A.Ts to augment his forces—both as messengers and expendable troops—when Cobra Commander's army outnumbers his. One is seen as a spying device, until battle damage reveals its camera and it is destroyed.

In issue #119, a new type of android is developed by Cobra, which mimics human appearance and movement. Since the purpose of these androids were infiltration and espionage rather than warfare (similar to the synthoids of the animated series), they were never really called B.A.Ts. These androids were destroyed by Scarlett, Snake Eyes and Storm Shadow. Another Cobra scientist named Dr. Knox, developed a more highly advanced version of the B.A.T., which was sent to go after Scarlett. Cobra is unable to produce more of it, as the only prototype was destroyed.

Devil's Due
After the events of the Marvel Comics series, B.A.Ts were hardly ever used again by Cobra. However, one resurfaced in the pages of the Devil's Due G.I. Joe comics as an advanced model type, with the appearance of the original model. The B.A.T. had been crafted by Doctor Mindbender and several Techno-Vipers. It was far more adaptable and capable of self-repair. It was stolen by Firefly after it killed Alley Viper's and Cobra troopers. During the incident it also battled Dreadnoks and Joe forces.

IDW Publishing
BATS were an essential part of the first story arc for IDW Publishing. They acted as guards for Cobra high command during a Joe siege.  In a slightly different continuity, a B.A.T. serves as a guard for the resources Cobra stores in its seemingly abandoned town of Springfield. As part of defending this, it injures Ripcord and kills Crankcase.

G.I. Joe vs Transformers
In Devil's Due miniseries G.I. Joe vs. the Transformers, Cobra brainwashed the Transformers, both Autobots and Decepticons, and used them as their main attack force. The brainwashed Transformers were referred as "Battle Android Troopers", seemingly as an homage to the BATs, since they were androids, too. The B.A.Ts themselves would make an appearance in the third series, in both ground and flying form, with an added ability - they could combine into Cobratron, a giant robot seemingly based on Combiners like Devastator. Despite this, they were swiftly defeated by the Joes' Cybertronian battle suits, and the visiting party of Autobots.

Animated series

Sunbow
The B.A.T.s were part of the new cast of characters in the second season of the G.I. Joe animated series from Sunbow Productions and Marvel Productions. They did not play any major role, and very much served as cannon fodder. Their main purpose was to show characters who could be hit (and destroyed) by laser fire since the cartoon production staff were prohibited from showing any living character being killed.

DiC
The second model B.A.Ts appeared in the G.I. Joe animated series by DiC Productions. In that series, they are led by Overkill. Unlike the first generation BATs, this series is able to pick themselves up after being damaged.

Direct-to-Video film series
B.A.T.s appear as the majority of Cobra's army and cannon fodder in G.I. Joe: Spy Troops and G.I. Joe: Valor vs. Venom.

Sigma 6
In the G.I. Joe: Sigma 6 series, the B.A.T.s come back with a more upgraded role, serving as the bulk and primary soldiers of Cobra's army. Their disposable nature, again, gives the Joe Team an excuse to be indiscriminate in battle. The B.A.T.s have a much more robotic appearance, and there is now more variants with different functions:

 Ninja B.A.T. - A ninja-type B.A.T.
 Aero-BAT - These B.A.T.s had wings.
 Cobra Mantis - A B.A.T. unit driven by Destro in episode 17.
 Overlord Vector - A B.A.T. with a snake torso.
 Overlord Virus - A ninja-type B.A.T. that was sent to Japan as backup for Storm Shadow. Under the influence of power stone, it is almost invincible. It later returns as a guard for an abandoned and seemingly haunted castle in Romania that Destro modified as a Cobra base.
 Overlord Vortex - A B.A.T. with a single red eye, two laser-firing arm cannons, and tank-like wheels for feet. Its metal hide is very hard to penetrate.
 Zeus - A Mega-B.A.T. created by Destro to destroy Megalo City. Zeus's AI is run by the captured Spud.

Renegades
In the G.I. Joe: Renegades episode "Castle Destro," the B.A.T.s are featured as prototype androids hidden in the armors that are seen in Destro's castle.

References

Villains in animated television series
Cobra (G.I. Joe) soldiers
Fictional robots